Kim Robert Stafford (born October 15, 1949) is an American poet and essayist who lives in Portland, Oregon.

Early life and education
Born and raised in Portland, Oregon, Stafford is the son of poet William Stafford. He earned a Bachelor of Arts, Master of Arts in English, and Ph.D. in medieval literature from the University of Oregon.

Career 
Since 1979, he has taught writing at Lewis & Clark College in Portland. He has also taught courses at Willamette University in Salem, at the Sitka Center for Art and Ecology, at the Fishtrap writers' gathering, and private workshops in Scotland, Italy, and Bhutan.

In July 2018, he was appointed the 9th Oregon Poet Laureate by Governor Kate Brown. He served in the role until 2020.

He is the founding director of the Northwest Writing Institute and is the literary executor of the Estate of William Stafford.

He was also a contributor to the Multnomah County project When You Were 15, in which "adults from our community share their stories about how an adult made a difference to them when they were fifteen. Several stories from today’s young people prove that they, too, need caring adults. These real life stories show how even a small act of encouragement can make a big difference in a teen’s life."

His work is featured at the Orenco Station on the Rings of Memory Plaza and the Witness Tree Rest.

Notable works
Legacy of Beginning: Poems in Bhutan (Larkspur Press, 2013).
100 Tricks Every Boy Can Do: How My Brother Disappeared (San Antonio: Trinity University Press, 2012) [memoir]
Prairie Prescription (Limberlost Press, 2011). [poetry chapbook]
The Muses Among Us: Eloquent Listening and other Pleasures of the Writer's Craft (University of Georgia Press, 2003).
Early Morning: Remembering My Father, William Stafford (Graywolf Press, 2001). [memoir]
A Thousand Friends of Rain: New & Selected Poems (Carnegie-Mellon U.P., 1998).
Oregon Pilgrimage in Green, illus. Margot Voorhies Thompson (Knight Library Press, 2000). [lament]
Lochsa Road: A Pilgrim in the West, illus. Hannah Hinchman (Confluence Press, 1991). [travel essay]
Wind on the Waves: Stories from the Oregon Coast (Graphic Arts, 1992: rpt. 2014). [fiction]
We Got Here Together, illus. Deborah Frasier (Harcourt Brace, 1994). (children's book)Entering the Grove, with photographs by Gary Braasch (Peregrine Smith, 1992). [essays about trees]A Gypsy's History of the World (Copper Canyon Press, 1976). [poems]Places & Stories (Carnegie-Mellon U.P., 1987). [poems]Having Everything Right: Essays of Place (Confluence Press, 1986; rpt. Penguin, 1987; Japanese translation from Editions Papyrus, 1994; rpt. Sasquatch, 1997).

Music:Pilgrim at Home: Vagabond Songs (a CD of original songs from Little Infinities, 2009)Wheel Made of Wind (a CD of original songs from Little Infinities, 1997)

Kim Stafford also served as editor or contributor for several books by William Stafford:Ask Me: 100 Essential Poems (Graywolf Press, 2014)Down in My Heart: Peace Witness in Wartime, edited with an introduction by Kim Stafford (Oregon State University Press, 2006).Every War Has Two Losers: William Stafford on Peace and War, edited with an introduction by Kim Stafford (Milkweed Editions, 2003). [poems, essays, interviews, statements on peace and war]Even in Quiet Places'', with an afterword by Kim Stafford (Confluence Press, 1994).

References

External links
Kim Stafford's Website
Northwest Writing Institute
Guide to the Kim Robert Stafford papers at the University of Oregon

American male poets
Writers from Portland, Oregon
Willamette University faculty
Lewis & Clark College faculty
1949 births
Living people
Poets Laureate of Oregon
20th-century American poets
20th-century American male writers
21st-century American poets
21st-century American male writers